Lekeberg Municipality (Lekebergs kommun) is a municipality in Örebro County in central Sweden. Its seat is located in the town of Fjugesta, with around 2,000 inhabitants.

Lekeberg was first formed as a municipality in connection with the local government reform of 1952 by the amalgamation of five smaller units. In 1967 two more parishes were added. The next reform of 1971 placed the area within Örebro Municipality. It was re-established in 1995 within its 1967 borders.

Geography
Mostly woods and farm lands, with Garphyttan National Park, established in 1909, located within the municipality.

The largest industry sector is farming. Many farmers have further specialized on hog and chicken farming.

Other industries are small companies within wood and carpentry industries, as well as craftswork and other small enterprises.

Localities
Over 200 inhabitants:
 Fjugesta (seat) 
 Gropen
 Hidinge
 Lanna
 Mullhyttan

Elections

Riksdag
From the 1994 election onwards the municipality was in existence due to the split with Örebro Municipality. The exact results of Sweden Democrats were not listed at a municipal level by SCB from 1994 to 1998 due to the party's small size at the time. "Turnout" denotes the percentage of eligible people casting any ballots, whereas "Votes" denotes the number of valid votes only.

Blocs

This lists the relative strength of the socialist and centre-right blocs since 1973, but parties not elected to the Riksdag are inserted as "other", including the Sweden Democrats results from 1994 to 2006. The sources are identical to the table above. The coalition or government mandate marked in bold formed the government after the election.

Sights
The monastery ruin of Riseberga was the home of nuns of the Cistercian order in the medieval age. It burnt down in 1546, and remaining stones were used in the building of a local church some hundreds years later.

The amphitheatre of Riseberga is Sweden's largest of that kind, with 1,216 seats.

Twin towns
Lekeberg's twin town with the year of its establishing:

 (1996) Dundaga, Latvia

References

External links

Lekeberg Municipality - Official site

Municipalities of Örebro County